Senghenydd Rugby Football Club are a Welsh rugby union club based in Senghenydd in South Wales. The club formed during the 1898/99 season built around the immigrant workers coming from port areas around Wales to find employment in the newly sunk Senghenydd coal mines.

Early history 
1904 saw the great religious revival throughout South Wales led by the lay preacher, Evan Roberts.  Rugby was seen as a wicked sport leading to violence and drunkenness, and Roberts managed to convert so many to his cause that Senghenydd RFC disbanded due to a lack of players. In 1907 a rugby team reformed under the name Senghenydd Bluebells RFC, before reverting to Senghenydd RFC.

On 14 October 1913 Britain's worst ever mining disaster occurred at Senghenydd Colliery, amongst the 439 victims were five members of Senghenydd RFC.

During the 1914/15 season Senghenydd applied for and was successful in gaining membership of the Welsh Rugby Union. This would allow them to play the larger affiliated clubs and take part in more accepted cup competitions. This new era of rugby did not occur due to the outbreak of World War I causing the cessation of competitive rugby throughout Wales.

Post 1945
One of Senghenydd RFC's most successful periods was during the late 1960s and early 1970s. By the time that the senior team won the Glamorgan County Silver Ball Trophy for the first time during the 1970/71 season they had won the Mid-District Championship four times in the previous five seasons. They made that five in six in 1970/71 when they finished the table with a perfect 20 wins out of 20 matches. The only major trophy the team failed to win in the 1970/71 season was the Mid District Cup, beaten by Beddau 17–11 in the final.

Club honours
1911/12 Cardiff and District League Championship, 2nd Division - Champions
1911/12 Lord Ninian Stuart Cup - Champions
1923/24 Lord Ninian Stuart Cup - Champions
1924/25 Lord Ninian Stuart Cup - Champions
1949/50 Ivor Williams Cup - Champions
1970/71 Mid-District Championship - Champions
1970/71 Glamorgan County Silver Ball Trophy - Winners
1971/72 Glamorgan County Silver Ball Trophy - Winners
1976/77 Ivor Williams Cup - Champions
2010/11 Swalec Bowl

External links 
 Senghenydd RFC

Bibliography

References 

Rugby clubs established in 1898
1898 establishments in Wales
Welsh rugby union teams